Sea Wolf is a shooter video game manufactured by Midway, originally released for arcades in 1976. It is a video game update of an earlier coin-operated electro-mechanical Midway game, Sea Devil, itself based on Sega's 1966 coin-op electro-mechanical arcade submarine simulator Periscope. The game was released in Japan by Taito. Sea Wolf was designed by Dave Nutting. The game sold 10,000 arcade cabinets, and was the highest-grossing arcade video game of 1976 and 1977 in the United States, and Japan's fifth highest-grossing arcade video game of 1976.
  
Midway released a color arcade sequel, Sea Wolf II, in 1978. In 1982, Commodore International produced cartridge ports of Sea Wolf for the VIC-20 and then-new Commodore 64 computers.

Gameplay

The player looks through a large periscope to aim at ships moving across the virtual sea line at the top of the screen, using a thumb button on the right handle of the scope to fire torpedoes.  The periscope swivels to the right and left, providing horizontal motion of a targeting cross-hair.  The cabinet features a mixture of video game and older electro-mechanical technology for player feedback.  Using back-lit transparencies reflected inside the scope, the number of torpedoes remaining are displayed, as well as a red "RELOAD" light which lights up momentarily when the player has launched five torpedoes.  Additionally, when a ship is hit, a corresponding "explosion" light is reflected onto the screen image at the ship's approximate position. A blue overlay is affixed to the screen to provide a "water color" to the sea.  Sounds include a sonar ping, the "whoosh" of launched torpedoes, torpedo explosions, and the klaxon sound of the PT boat racing across the screen.

Sea Wolf is time-limited, with the player having an opportunity to win bonus time by reaching an operator-set score.  The player's score is shown on the bottom half of the screen as well as the high score, one of the first known instances of a high score in a video game.  Targets include destroyers, a fast-moving PT boat, and mines floating across the screen that serve as obstructions.

Reception
In the United States, Sea Wolf was the highest-grossing arcade video game for two years in a row, in 1976 and in 1977. It was later the third highest-grossing arcade game of 1978 according to Play Meter, or the year's fourth highest according to RePlay.

In Japan, Sea Wolf was a commercial success for Taito. On the first annual Game Machine arcade chart, Sea Wolf was the fifth highest-grossing arcade video game of 1976 in Japan, below Taito's Ball Park (Tornado Baseball) and Speed Race DX (Wheels), Sega's Heavyweight Champ, and Breakout (licensed by Namco from Atari).

Sea Wolf eventually sold a total of 10,000 arcade cabinets. Sea Wolf II sold another 4,000 units.

Legacy
Sea Wolf was followed by Sea Wolf II in 1978. In 1983 Epyx ported Sea Wolf II and another Midway game, Gun Fight, to the Atari 8-bit family and released them in an "Arcade Classics" compilation.

In 2008, Coastal Amusements released a retro video redemption game based on the original Sea Wolf.

High score
The current world record holder for Sea Wolf is Alan Radue with a score of 11,300 points. The record was set on October 2, 2011 at the Tranquility Base Arcade and verified by Twin Galaxies International on October 9, 2011.

References

External links

1976 video games
Arcade video games
Atari 8-bit family games
Commodore 64 games
VIC-20 games
Midway video games
Naval video games
Video games developed in the United States
Video games with underwater settings